Homeland is a census-designated place (CDP) in Riverside County, California, United States. The population was 5,969 at the 2010 census, up from 3,710 at the 2000 census.

Geography
Homeland is located at  (33.741859, -117.113201).

Demographics

2010
At the 2010 census Homeland had a population of 5,969. The racial makeup of Homeland was 3,727 (62.4%) White, 130 (2.2%) African American, 85 (1.4%) Native American, 49 (0.8%) Asian, 15 (0.3%) Pacific Islander, 1,673 (28.0%) from other races, and 290 (4.9%) from two or more races. Hispanic or Latino of any race were 3,110 persons (52.1%).

The census reported that 5,959 people (99.8% of the population) lived in households, 10 (0.2%) lived in non-institutionalized group quarters, and no one was institutionalized.

There were 1,964 households, 691 (35.2%) had children under the age of 18 living in them, 948 (48.3%) were opposite-sex married couples living together, 259 (13.2%) had a female householder with no husband present, 144 (7.3%) had a male householder with no wife present.  There were 143 (7.3%) unmarried opposite-sex partnerships, and 11 (0.6%) same-sex married couples or partnerships. 494 households (25.2%) were one person and 314 (16.0%) had someone living alone who was 65 or older. The average household size was 3.03.  There were 1,351 families (68.8% of households); the average family size was 3.63.

The age distribution was 1,655 people (27.7%) under the age of 18, 545 people (9.1%) aged 18 to 24, 1,362 people (22.8%) aged 25 to 44, 1,354 people (22.7%) aged 45 to 64, and 1,053 people (17.6%) who were 65 or older.  The median age was 36.1 years. For every 100 females, there were 102.0 males.  For every 100 females age 18 and over, there were 96.1 males.

There were 2,262 housing units at an average density of 529.8 per square mile, of the occupied units 1,330 (67.7%) were owner-occupied and 634 (32.3%) were rented. The homeowner vacancy rate was 5.0%; the rental vacancy rate was 5.5%.  3,554 people (59.5% of the population) lived in owner-occupied housing units and 2,405 people (40.3%) lived in rental housing units.

2000
At the 2000 census there were 3,710 people, 1,572 households, and 985 families in the CDP. The racial makeup of the CDP was 80.0% White, 0.8% Black or African American, 1.1% Native American, 0.5% Asian, 0.1% Pacific Islander, 13.9% from other races, and 3.7% from two or more races.  29.7% of the population were Hispanic or Latino of any race.
Of the 1,572 households 21.4% had children under the age of 18 living with them, 48.6% were married couples living together, 9.5% had a female householder with no husband present, and 37.3% were non-families. 33.1% of households were one person and 22.0% were one person aged 65 or older.  The average household size was 2.4 and the average family size was 3.0.

The age distribution was 23.0% under the age of 18, 6.7% from 18 to 24, 21.1% from 25 to 44, 18.0% from 45 to 64, and 31.1% 65 or older.  The median age was 44 years. For every 100 females, there were 91.7 males.  For every 100 females age 18 and over, there were 88.2 males.

The median household income was $20,607 and the median family income  was $22,631. Males had a median income of $25,481 versus $20,038 for females. The per capita income for the CDP was $11,338.  About 19.6% of families and 26.4% of the population were below the poverty line, including 50.9% of those under age 18 and 6.0% of those age 65 or over.

Politics
In the state legislature Homeland is located in the 37th Senate District, represented by Republican Bill Emmerson, and in the 65th Assembly District, represented by Republican Paul Cook.

References

Census-designated places in Riverside County, California
Census-designated places in California